CH Energy Group, Inc. is most known for its subsidiary Central Hudson Gas & Electric, commonly known as Central Hudson. Central Hudson Gas & Electric delivers electricity and natural gas  to residents of a  service territory that extends north from the suburbs of metropolitan New York City to the Capital District at Albany. It is a subsidiary of Fortis Inc., a diversified electric utility holding company based in Canada, though Central Hudson is headquartered in Poughkeepsie, New York.

History
Central Hudson Gas & Electric Corporation was officially formed in 1925 after a merger of 80-plus independent electric and gas companies in the state of New York. Later, CH Energy Group, Inc. was formed as a parent organization of Central Hudson Gas & Electric Corporation and a family of subsidiaries known as Central Hudson Enterprises Corporation (CHEC) in 2000. CHEC is a non-regulatory subsidiary, composed primarily of Griffith Energy Services, which supplies petroleum products and related services to approximately 56,000 customers in the Mid Atlantic Region. In 2013, Fortis Inc. acquired CH Energy Group for US$1.5 billion which included the assumption of approximately US$500 million of debt.

Operations
Central Hudson is the only electricity and natural gas delivery provider for the 300,000 electric and 78,000 natural gas customers residing in their  service territory. New York is an open market state for electricity; customers can choose who buys and resells their supply of energy since utilities are generally not permitted to operate the power plants that provide electricity in the state of New York; however, Central Hudson must be contracted to deliver the energy. Central Hudson's delivery rate is fixed and must be approved by a regulatory review and approval process involving the Public Service Commission. In 2020, electric and gas revenue for the year was $711,895,000.

See also
 Lelan Sillin, Jr.
 Walkway over the Hudson

References

External links
 Central Hudson official site

Fortis Inc.
Electric power companies of the United States